Belinda Cordwell and Elizabeth Smylie were the defending champions, but none competed this year.

Jo Durie and Jill Hetherington won the title by defeating Pascale Paradis and Catherine Suire 6–4, 6–1 in the final.

Seeds
The first four seeds received a bye to the second round.

Draw

Finals

Top half

Bottom half

References

External links
 Official results archive (ITF)

DHL doubles
WTA Singapore Open
1990 in Singaporean sport